Jankoji Rao Scindia II (1805 – 7 February 1843), was Maharaja of Gwalior (1827 – 1843).

Life
Jankoji Rao was born in 1805 as Mugat Rao Scindia, son of Patloji Rao Scindia, by his wife, the sister of Krishnaji Rao Kadam, sometime Regent of Gwalior.

Daulat Rao Scindia died in Lashkar, Gwalior, on 21 March 1827, without heir (his only son Madhorao Scindia died when 8 months old, in Gwalior in 1812). On his death bed, he left the State and succession in the hands of the British Government, noting his desire that his widow Baiza Bai was to be treated with respect. Baiza Bai was the queen of Gwalior from 21 March 1827 to 17 June 1827. Jankoji was adopted by Baiza Bai, and ascended the throne on 18 June 1827.
 
Jankoji reigned under the regency of Baiza Bai until he came of age and was invested with full ruling powers on December 1832. Jankoji died at Lashkar on 7 February 1843.

References

External links

Scindia dynasty of Gwalior
1805 births
1843 deaths